Salon music was a popular music genre in Europe during the 19th century. It was usually written for solo piano in the romantic style, and often performed by the composer at events known as "Salons". Salon compositions are usually fairly short and often focus on virtuoso pianistic display or emotional expression of a sentimental character. Common subgenres of salon music are the operatic paraphrase or fantasia, in which multiple themes from a popular opera are the basis of the composition, and the musical character-piece, which portrays in music a particular situation or narrative.

Salon composers
Many popular composers wrote at least a few pieces which fall into the category of salon music. Some pianists composed only salon music, but many of these specialists have become highly obscure. The following is a list of nineteenth- and early twentieth-century composers in whose work salon music was predominant.

 Franz Behr
 Carl Bohm
 Mélanie Bonis
 Georges Boulanger (violinist)
 Teresa Carreño
 Ignacio Cervantes
 Emmanuel Chabrier
 Cécile Chaminade
 Frédéric Chopin
 Charles Delioux
 Benjamin Godard
 Louis Moreau Gottschalk
 Alphonse Hasselmans
 Henri Herz
 Jean-Chrisostome Hess
 Rudolph G. Kopp
 Théodore Lack
 Georges Lamothe
 Gustav Lange
 Désiré Magnus
 Jules Massenet
 Fanny Mendelssohn
 Ignaz Moscheles
 Moritz Moszkowski
 Charles Oberthür
 Joseph O'Kelly
 Georges Pfeiffer
 Auguste Pilati
 Juventino Rosas
 Julius Schulhoff
 Martinus Sieveking
 Sidney Smith
 Maria Szymanowska
 Sigismond Thalberg
 Francis Thomé
 Francesco Paolo Tosti
 Paul Wachs
 Ethelbert Nevin

Well known performers
 Adolf Busch
 Fritz Busch
 Pablo Casals
 Emanuel Feuermann
 Jascha Heifetz
 Paul Hindemith
 Fritz Kreisler
 Pablo Sarasate
 Rudolf Serkin
 Jacques Thibaud

References

19th-century music genres
Classical music styles